The Leica T (Typ 701) is a  digital mirrorless interchangeable lens camera announced by Leica Camera on April 24, 2014. It is the first camera using the Leica L-Mount  (previously known as the T mount), and was announced alongside two new lenses for that mount, a 23 mm f/2 prime and an 18–56 mm f/3.5–5.6 zoom, as well as an adapter for Leica M lenses.

In 2017 the successor TL-2 was introduced. It uses a 24 MP-sensor and has an internal memory of 32 GB.

References

External links 
 
 
 Leica T (Typ 701) Apr 24, 2014

T (Typ 701)
Cameras introduced in 2014